Agnes Elsie Diana Herbert, OBE (late 1870s – 1960) was a British writer and big game hunter.

The daughter of James Bateman Thorpe, she was born Agnes Elsie Diana Thorpe on the Isle of Man and grew up there. She was privately tutored. With a cousin, she visited the Canadian Rockies, where the two women taught Chinese kitchen workers in mining camps how to cook English-style food; they also tried hunting. In 1906, the two cousins left on a hunting trip to Somaliland. She had one daughter, the novelist Bradda Field.

She first married a Mr. Herbert and became a widow some time later. In 1913, she married Archibald Thomas Stewart, a commander in the Royal Navy.

Herbert was a member of the Society of Women Journalists, also serving as its vice-chair and later vice-president. She was editor of the Writers' & Artists' Yearbook from 1922 to 1929. In 1931, Herbert was named an officer of the Order of the British Empire.

Selected bibliography
 Two Dianas in Somaliland: The Record of a Shooting Trip  (1908)
 Isle of Man (1909)
 Two Dianas in Alaska (1909)
 The Life Story of a Lion (1911)
 Casuals in the Caucasus: The Diary of a Sporting Holiday (1912)
 The Moose (1913)
 The Elephant (1917)
 Northumberland. Painted by A. Heaton Cooper. Described by Agnes Herbert (1923)
 A Girl's Adventure in Korea (1924)

See also
 List of famous big game hunters

References

External links

Year of birth uncertain
1960 deaths
British travel writers
British hunters
Manx writers
Officers of the Order of the British Empire
Manx women writers
20th-century Manx writers
British women travel writers